"Neva Eva" is the first single from Trillville's debut album The King of Crunk & BME Recordings Present: Trillville & Lil Scrappy. The song features Lil Scrappy and Lil Jon.

Charts

Weekly charts

Year-end charts

References

2003 songs
Southern hip hop songs
Lil Scrappy songs
Song recordings produced by Lil Jon
Lil Jon songs
Crunk songs